The Jersey City Skeeters were a minor league baseball team which operated in Jersey City, New Jersey.  The club started in the 1860s and by 1870 joined the National Association of Base Ball Players.

By 1885, Jersey City had joined the Eastern League, but they dropped out before the end of the season.  The team rejoined the league the following year, finishing in second place.

In 1887, a Jersey City Skeeters team was playing in the International League, but in 1888, they were in the Central League, a much lower league, competition-wise.

The team participated in three other leagues before 1902, with little success.  In that year, however, the city of Jersey City built the club a new stadium, and the team committed to the Eastern League.  They finished in third place in their first year in the league, but in 1903, they fielded a championship team.  That year, the team won their first 18 games, and had a stretch of 25 consecutive victories.  They won the league with a record of 92–33. The 1903 Skeeters were recognized as one of the 100 greatest minor league teams of all time.

That team was managed by 39-year-old player-manager Billy Murray, who stayed with the team through 1906, but the team never won another championship.

The club suffered heavy financial losses in 1914 and on February 24, 1915 owners William Stephen Devery and Thomas A. Fogarty forfeited the franchise to the International League. The league ran the team for the one season and sold it to James R. Price and Fred Tenney, who moved the club to Newark, New Jersey.

A newly organized International League formed in 1918, following World War I, and Jersey City received a league franchise.  An attempt was made to change the team's name from Skeeters (so named because of the ubiquitous mosquitos in the New Jersey swamps), but fans rejected the proposed Colts nickname, and the Skeeters name stuck.  In 1933, however, the Great Depression caused the folding of many leagues and teams, and the Jersey City franchise was moved to Syracuse, New York.

Baseball returned to Jersey City in 1937, when the New York Giants moved their highest-level minor league team to Jersey City, calling the team the Jersey City Giants.

The team name was revived as a vintage base ball team in 2009.

References

External links

 

Baseball teams established in 1870
Sports clubs disestablished in 1933
National Association of Base Ball Players teams
Defunct International League teams
Jersey City Skeeters
Brooklyn Dodgers minor league affiliates
Defunct baseball teams in New Jersey
1870 establishments in New Jersey
1933 disestablishments in New Jersey
Baseball teams disestablished in 1933
Atlantic Association teams